Richmond is an electoral district of the Legislative Assembly in the Australian state of Victoria. It is currently a 13 km² electorate in the inner east of Melbourne, encompassing the suburbs of Richmond, Cremorne, Burnley, Abbotsford, Collingwood, Clifton Hill, North Fitzroy and Fitzroy. Historically a very safe seat for the Labor Party, Richmond has in recent elections become increasingly marginal against the Greens, who narrowly failed to win it at the 2014 Victorian state election.

History
Richmond is one of only three electorates (along with Brighton and Williamstown) to have been contested at every election since 1856. It was initially a two-member electorate, but was changed to return only a single member in the redistribution of 1904 when several new districts were created including Abbotsford. It covers a series of traditionally working-class, industrial suburbs, and has been continuously held by the Labor Party with the exception of only one term since 1904. The brief exception occurred amidst the famous Labor split of 1955, when the incumbent Labor member, Frank Scully, joined six other Catholic MPs in breaking away to found the Democratic Labor Party. Scully, as the party's leader, was the only MP to hold his seat at the next election, but was defeated in 1958 by Bill Towers, previously the member for the abolished seat of Collingwood.

Though a traditionally safe Labor seat, it has become progressively marginal in recent years due to increasing support for the Greens in the area. This first occurred at the 2002 state election, when union organiser Gemma Pinnell nearly won the seat on Liberal preferences, taking 47 per cent of the two-party preferred vote. The Green surge was seen as a reaction to the conservative policies of the then federal Labor leader, Kim Beazley, by the generally progressive inner city constituency. Labor polled slightly better in the 2006 state election, taking 54% of the two-party preferred against Greens candidate and local councillor Gurm Sekhon. It remains a marginal seat, however, and was strongly contested by Greens candidate, Kathleen Maltzahn, at the state elections in 2010 and 2014.

Former member Richard Wynne, a Labor Party member, served as the state Minister for Housing and Minister for Local Government in the Bracks and Brumby governments from 2006 to 2010, and was the Minister for Planning in the  second Andrews government. Wynne gained the seat in 1999 after the former Labor member, Demetri Dollis, was disendorsed for extended absence overseas.

The current member is Gabrielle de Vietri.

Historical maps

Members for Richmond

 = by-election

Election results

References

External links
 Richmond District - Victorian Electoral Commission

Electoral districts of Victoria (Australia)
1856 establishments in Australia
Fitzroy, Victoria
City of Yarra
Electoral districts and divisions of Greater Melbourne